The 2009 Clemson Tigers football team represented Clemson University in the 2009 NCAA Division I FBS football season. The Tigers were led by head coach Dabo Swinney, who was in his first full season as head coach. The Tigers played their home games in Memorial Stadium. The Tigers won the ACC Atlantic Division, but after securing the title lost to in–state rival South Carolina in the Palmetto Bowl 34–17, before losing for the second time in the season to Georgia Tech in the ACC Championship Game. Clemson closed the season with a win over Kentucky in the Music City Bowl.

Season summary

In the Tiger's 40–24 victory over the Florida State Seminoles on November 7, 2009, running back C. J. Spiller and wide receiver Jacoby Ford became the leading all-purpose yardage duo in NCAA history (a record previously held by Marshall Faulk and Darnay Scott of San Diego State).

C. J. Spiller was named as one of the three finalists for the 2009 Doak Walker Award.  Spiller, along with Mark Ingram II of Alabama and Toby Gerhart of Stanford, was selected by a vote of the 130–member Doak Walker Award National Selection Committee.  On December 2, 2009, Spiller was voted the 2009 Atlantic Coast Conference Player of the Year.  The all-purpose threat was named as the league's top player following a vote of 40 members of the Atlantic Coast Sports Media Association.  Spiller received 29 votes to outdistance Georgia Tech quarterback Josh Nesbitt, who had eight. Virginia Tech running back Ryan Williams, the league's rookie of the year, had two votes and Yellow Jackets defensive end Derrick Morgan had one.  Spiller was the nation's only player this season to account for touchdowns five different ways – rushing, passing, receiving, and on kick and punt returns – and had passing, rushing and receiving TDs in one game, a victory against North Carolina State.  He returned four kickoffs and a punt for scores this year and has eight total returns for TDs during his career.  He scored at least once in every game this season while leading Clemson to the Atlantic Division title and a spot in the league title game against Georgia Tech. Spiller led the ACC with an average of nearly 184 all-purpose yards and was the league's fourth-leading rusher, averaging 76 yards.  Spiller is the seventh Tiger to be named player of the year and the first since Michael Dean Perry in 1987.

Incoming recruiting class
Malliciah Goodman (DE; Florence, South Carolina; West Florence HS)
J.K. Jay (OL; Greenville, South Carolina; Christ Church Episcopal School)
Jonathan Meeks (S; Rock Hill, South Carolina; Rock Hill HS)
Tyler Shatley (FB; Valdese, North Carolina; East Burke HS)
Brandon Thomas (OL; Spartanburg, South Carolina; Dorman HS)
Bryce McNeal (WR; Minneapolis, Minnesota; Breck HS)
Roderick McDowell (RB; Sumter, South Carolina; Sumter HS)
Tajh Boyd (QB; Hampton, Virginia; Phoebus HS)
Spencer Shuey (LB/DE; Charlotte, North Carolina; South Mecklenburg HS)
Quandon Christian (LB; Lake View, South Carolina; Lake View HS)
Corico Hawkins (LB; Milledgeville, Georgia; Baldwin HS)
Darell Smith (TE/BAN; Gadsen, Alabama; Gadsen City HS)
Taylor Ogle (QB; Gatlinburg, Tennessee; Gatlinburg-Pittman HS)
Octavius Lewis(SS;Orlando, FL Maynard Evans HS)

Rankings

Jersey numbers

#17 jersey
On July 25, it was announced that sophomore linebacker Stanley Hunter was forced to quit playing football due to medical reasons.  Hunter, who led the 2008 team in fewest plays per tackle, was suffering from an increase in seizures due to epilepsy.  On August 18, Coach Swinney announced that several players would alternate wearing #17 during the season as a way to honor Stanley Hunter.

List of Players wearing #17 during the season:
LB Brandon Maye
QB Willy Korn
FB Chad Diehl
WR Xavier Dye
WR Marquan Jones
S DeAndre McDaniel
RB Jamie Harper
S Sadat Chambers
S Rashard Hall
CB Crezdon Butler
LB Kavell Conner
WR Jacoby Ford

Three of the players who wore #17 (Korn, Diehl, and Dye) were also teammates with Hunter at James F. Byrnes High School in Spartanburg, South Carolina.  Stanley Hunter remains a member of the Clemson team, serving as a student-coach this season for the Tigers.

#6 jersey
Cornerback Chris Chancellor, whose normal number is #38, wore #6, the normal number of wide receiver Jacoby Ford, for the Miami game. (Under college football rules, two or more players on a team can wear the same number as long as only one is on the field at a time.) Chancellor, a native of Miami, made the change with the blessing of both Ford and Swinney in memory of his former high school teammate Jasper Howard, a cornerback who wore #6 for Connecticut and was murdered in the early morning of October 18 following UConn's game against Louisville.

#28 jersey
At the end of the season, Head Coach Dabo Swinney announced that they would retire the #28 jersey worn by C. J. Spiller at a ceremony when the Tigers play Maryland at home on Oct. 16, 2010.

Schedule

Depth chart
These are the starters, primary backups, and key reserves as of September 2009.

Coaching staff
Dabo Swinney – Head Coach
Billy Napier – Offensive Coordinator/Quarterbacks
Kevin Steele – Defensive Coordinator/Inside Linebackers
Charlie Harbison – Co-Defensive Coordinator/Defensive Backs
Danny Pearman – Assistant Head Coach/Tackles & Tight Ends
Brad Scott – Associate Head Coach/Offensive Guards and Centers
Dan Brooks – Defensive Tackles
Andre Powell – Running Backs/Special Teams
Chris Rumph – Defensive Ends
Jeff Scott – Recruiting Coordinator/Wide Receivers

2010 NFL draft
Clemson had five players selected in the 2010 NFL draft. C. J. Spiller went in the first round as the ninth overall pick.

References

Clemson
Clemson Tigers football seasons
Music City Bowl champion seasons
Clemson Tigers football